Challenge of the Masters is a 1976 martial arts-action film released in Hong Kong by Shaw Brothers, and directed by Lau Kar Leung.

Plot
After his father refuses to teach him kung fu and he is constantly being beaten by rival school students, a young Wong Fei Hung (Gordon Liu) must train under Luk Ah Choy (Chen Kuan Tai) to avenge the evils being done by the rival school.

Cast
 Gordon Liu – Wong Fei Hung
 Chen Kuan-tai – Luk Ah Choy
 Lily Li – Sau Lien
 Lau Kar-leung – Ho Fu
 Lau Kar-wing - Officer Yuan Ching
 Yuen Biao - Master Pang's student
 Ricky Hui - Lung
 Fung Hak-On - Yeung Chung
 Eric Tsang - Master Lin's student
 Billy Chan - Master Pang's student
 Kara Hui 
 Lam Ching-ying - Master Pang's student
 Wilson Tong - Master Tang
 John Cheung - Master Pang's student
 Danny Chow - Master Lin's student
 Huang Ha - Master Lin's student
 Mang Hoi - contestant at Pao contest

External links
 

1976 films
1976 martial arts films
1976 action films
Kung fu films
Hong Kong martial arts films
Shaw Brothers Studio films
Films directed by Lau Kar-leung
Films set in 19th-century Qing dynasty
1970s Hong Kong films